The kululu (Sarotherodon steinbachi) e.g. Vikululu - Nikululu - Akululu - Bokululu - Hekululu is a species of cichlid endemic to Lake Barombi Mbo in western Cameroon.  This species can reach a length of  SL. It is threatened because of pollution and sedimentation due to human activities. It is potentially also threatened by large emissions of carbon dioxide (CO2) from the lake's bottom (compare Lake Nyos), although studies indicate that Barombo Mbo lacks excess amounts of this gas.

It feeds on tiny organisms such as rotifers, diatoms and sponge spicules, and organic debris.

The specific name honours the entomologist Gerhard Steinbach (1923-2016) of the Humboldt University of Berlin who was a member of an expedition which was led by zoologist Martin Eisentraut on which the type of this cichlid was collected.

References

External links 
 Photograph

Endemic fauna of Cameroon
kululu
Cichlid fish of Africa
Fish of Lake Barombi Mbo
Fish described in 1962
Taxonomy articles created by Polbot